= Maddulapalli =

Coordinates: 18°42′N 79°02′E

Maddulapalli is a village of Jagtial district, Pegadapalli mandal, in Telangana, India.
